The Tony Award for Best Featured Actress in a Play is an honor presented at the Tony Awards, a ceremony established in 1947 as the Antoinette Perry Awards for Excellence in Theatre, to actresses for quality supporting roles in a Broadway play. The awards are named after Antoinette Perry, an American actress who died in 1946. Honors in several categories are presented at the ceremony annually by the Tony Award Productions, a joint venture of The Broadway League and the American Theatre Wing, to "honor the best performances and stage productions of the previous year."

Originally called the "Tony Award for Actress, Supporting or Featured (Dramatic)", Patricia Neal first won the award at the inception of the ceremony for her portrayal of Regina Hubbard in Lillian Hellman's Another Part of the Forest. Before 1956, nominees' names were not made public: the change was made by the awards committee to "have a greater impact on theatregoers". The award was renamed in 1976, when Shirley Knight became the first winner under the new title for her role as Carla in Robert Patrick's Kennedy's Children. Its most recent recipient is Phylicia Rashad, for the role of Faye, in Skeleton Crew.

Six actresses (Christine Baranski, Judith Ivey, Judith Light, Swoosie Kurtz, Audra McDonald, and Frances Sternhagen) hold the record for most awards in this category, each with a total of two.  Portrayals of Ruth Younger in A Raisin in the Sun have won twice, for Audra McDonald and Sophie Okonedo. Supporting actresses in two of three plays in Neil Simon's Eugene trilogy (Brighton Beach Memoirs and Broadway Bound) were nominated for the Tony, and featured actresses in six parts of August Wilson's The Pittsburgh Cycle have also been nominated for the award.

Recipients

Win total
2 Wins
 Christine Baranski
 Judith Ivey
 Swoosie Kurtz
 Judith Light 
 Audra McDonald
 Frances Sternhagen

Nomination total

5 Nominations
 Frances Sternhagen

4 Nominations
 Dana Ivey

3 Nominations
 Elizabeth Franz
 Eileen Heckart
 Jayne Houdyshell
 Judith Ivey
 Celia Keenan-Bolger
 Swoosie Kurtz
 Judith Light
 Condola Rashād
 Marian Seldes
 Lois Smith
 Zoë Wanamaker
 Julie White

2 Nominations
 Jane Alexander
 Rae Allen
 Christine Baranski
 Leora Dana
 Viola Davis
 Johanna Day
 Linda Emond
 Fionnula Flanagan
 Alice Ghostley
 Mary Beth Hurt
 Zohra Lampert
 Linda Lavin
 Anna Manahan
 Jan Maxwell
 Audra McDonald
 Laurie Metcalf
 Debra Monk
 Rosemary Murphy
 Cynthia Nixon
 Martha Plimpton
 Amy Ryan
 Carole Shelley
 Maureen Stapleton
 Margaret Tyzack

Character win total
2 Wins
 Ruth Younger from A Raisin in the Sun

Character nomination total

3 Nominations
 Brooke Ashton from Noises Off
 Honey from Who's Afraid of Virginia Woolf?

2 Nominations
 Bananas Shaughnessy from The House of Blue Leaves
 Beneatha Younger from A Raisin in the Sun
 Beverly from The Shadow Box
 Big Mama Pollitt from Cat on a Hot Tin Roof
 Birdie Hubbard from The Little Foxes
 Charlotte from The Real Thing
 Hannah Pitt (and others) from Angels in America
 Harper Pitt (and others) from Angels in America
 Lady Gay Spanker from London Assurance
 Lady in Red from For Colored Girls Who Have Considered Suicide / When the Rainbow Is Enuf
 Lavinia Penniman from The Heiress
 Linda Loman from Death of a Salesman
 Madge Kendal from The Elephant Man
 Maria Merelli from Lend Me a Tenor
 Marthy Owen from Anna Christie
 Mavis Parodus Bryson from The Sign in Sidney Brustein's Window
 Ruth Younger from A Raisin in the Sun

Trivia
 Supporting actresses in two of three plays in Neil Simon's Eugene trilogy (Brighton Beach Memoirs and Broadway Bound) were nominated for the Tony.
 Featured actresses in six parts of August Wilson's The Pittsburgh Cycle have been nominated for the award.
Featured actress Trazana Beverley in Ntozake Shange's for colored girls who have considered suicide / when the rainbow is enuf is the first African American actor to receive the award.

See also

 Tony Award for Best Featured Actor in a Play
 Tony Award for Best Performance by a Featured Actor in a Musical
 Tony Award for Best Featured Actress in a Musical

Notes

References

External links
 Internet Broadway Database Awards Archive
 Official Tony Awards Website Archive

Tony Awards
Awards established in 1947
Theatre acting awards
Awards for actresses